Mesogona is a genus of moths of the family Noctuidae.

Species
 Mesogona acetosellae (Denis & Schiffermüller, 1775)
 Mesogona olivata (Harvey, 1874)
 Mesogona oxalina (Hübner, [1803])
 Mesogona rubra Crabo & Hammond, 1998
 Mesogona subcuprea Crabo & Hammond, 1998

References
Natural History Museum Lepidoptera genus database
Mesogona at funet
A revision of Mesogona Boisduval (Lepidoptera: Noctuidae)for North America with descriptions of two new species

Noctuinae